The Savanna's Act or #MMIW Act reforms law enforcement and justice protocols appropriate to address missing and murdered Native women, and for other purposes. An initial version of the bill passed the Senate on December 6, 2018. It was held by Bob Goodlatte on December 10, 2018.

The bill, after the 2018–19 United States federal government shutdown reintroduced in 2019 as S.227, was nicknamed after Fargo, North Dakota resident Savanna LaFontaine-Greywind was brutally murdered in August 2017 as an example of the horrific statistics regarding abuse and homicide of Native American women. A related bill on the state level is Hanna's Act in Montana, a bill named after Hanna Harris of the Northern Cheyenne Indian Tribe in Montana, who was 21 years old when she went missing on July 4, 2013.

Support and opposition
Initially just a method to improve data collection on missing and murdered Indigenous women to address that crisis for law enforcement bodies on both reservations and non-reservation US territories, modifications to give tribal law enforcement access to federal databases seems to expose a lack of trust on both sides. In this specific case, the woman being pregnant and her baby having been harvested by the murderer, two people went missing: the woman and her baby. To help this act along, the  Not Invisible Act of 2019 was introduced (since replaced by ) to the House on the initiative of Deb Haaland and Norma Torres and to the Senate by Catherine Cortez Masto on April 2, 2019 to increase intergovernmental coordination to identify and combat violent crime within Indian lands and of Indians. It was finally passed by Congress alongside the Not Invisible Act in September 2020. Both acts were signed into law by President Donald Trump.

Legacy
The story of the LaFontaine-Greywind murder was made into an episode of a true crime series on HLN called "Nightmare in Fargo" in 2021.

References

External links
 MMIWG Database
 Senate Bill Pushes The Feds To Focus On Violence Against Native Women, by Jennifer Bendery, April 3, 2019 for Huffington Post
 Crisis Missing and Murdered Native American Women by Grace Segers on June 12, 2019 for CBS news
 Statement about Savanna's Act by Tracy Toulou of the Office of Tribal Justice before Senate Committee on Indian Affairs, June 19, 2019

Proposed legislation of the 115th United States Congress
Criminal justice reform in the United States
United States federal criminal legislation
Missing and Murdered Indigenous Women and Girls movement